Road Salt Two is the eighth studio album by Swedish band Pain of Salvation, released on 26 September 2011, by InsideOut. It is the final album to feature keyboardist Fredrik Hermansson, who had appeared on all previous releases by the band. Around the inside lips of the back cover is the following sentence: "This album, however, is NOT a part of The Perfect Element concept...but for what it's worth, it easily COULD have been, right? Right?"

Track listing
Concept, music and lyrics by Daniel Gildenlöw.

Standard Edition

Limited Edition Digipack
"Road Salt Theme" - 0:45
"Softly She Cries" - 4:15
"Conditioned" - 4:15
"Healing Now" - 4:29
"To The Shoreline" - 3:03
"Break Darling Break" (bonus track) - 2:22
"Eleven" - 6:55
"1979" - 2:53
"Of Salt" (bonus track) - 2:36
"The Deeper Cut" - 6:10
"Mortar Grind" - 5:46
"Through The Distance" - 2:56
"The Physics Of Gridlock" - 8:43
"End Credits" - 3:25

The Japanese edition includes both bonus tracks from the limited edition, with an addition of "Last Night" and "Thirty-Eight"

Personnel
Daniel Gildenlöw - lead vocals, backing vocals, electric and acoustic and fretless guitars, bass guitar
Johan Hallgren - electric guitars, backing vocals, lead vocals on "Softly She Cries"
Fredrik Hermansson - electric and acoustic pianos, organs, mellotron, other keyboards
Léo Margarit - drums, backing vocals

External links
Official Pain of Salvation website
Official Pain of Salvation forum
Road Salt Two review on Prog Sphere

Pain of Salvation albums
2011 albums
Inside Out Music albums